Nordal may refer to:

People with the surname
 Nordal Wille (1858-1924), Norwegian botanist
 Ólöf Nordal (1966–2017), member of the Icelandic parliament
 Sigurður Nordal (1886-1974), Icelandic scholar, writer and ambassador

Other uses
 Nordal Hundred, a hundred of Sweden
 a barley (Hordeum vulgare) cultivar